Dan Vs. is an American animated television series created by Dan Mandel and Chris Pearson. The series spanned three seasons, airing on The Hub from January 1, 2011, to March 9, 2013. 53 episodes were produced.

Plot
The show is about Dan, a jobless misanthrope with a soft spot for animals, caught in odd misfortunes and unable to provide income for himself. Accompanying him is his better-off friend Chris, a big softy, who lives in a comfortable home and has a steady income (he even reluctantly pays for the little or big expenses that Dan needs). His dull day-job and stressful work causes him to be unable to resist going along with Dan's wild plots to get even, despite how ridiculous they may seem. Even when Dan gets on his last nerve, he cannot abandon him, "knowing there is something worth saving in him". Both their friendship, stemming from a bad experience at summer camp, through High School these two, along with Chris' wife Elise, go after the things that make society even more unbearable than it already is. The third regular character is Elise, Chris's wife, who objects to Chris's participation in Dan's revenge quests, but, on occasion joins in due to some of Dan's plots sharing similarities with her childhood annoyances or her secret operative work for the government. Elise's character enables advanced help with some of Dan's revenge missions due to her skills and most of her missions act as a subplot in the show. The show is set primarily in the Los Angeles area, and background scenes often show notable landmarks in and around Los Angeles.

Episodes

Characters

Main
 Dan (voiced by Curtis Armstrong) – Dan is a mismanaged temperamental man with serious anger issues due to a rough childhood. Due to his upbringing, he becomes hostile, short-tempered, impatient, and easily provoked. On most occasions, he conserves himself from any enraged behavior, but when things get to the last straw he is unable to control his anger and decides to get even with his foes on a you-keyed-my-car-I-key-your-car level. Being very childish and tenacious, causes him to embark on missions to get revenge on anyone and anything he deems has wronged him. Sometimes getting too out-of-hand and becoming a handful, he has been thrown out of libraries, been tear-gassed so many times that he doesn't notice it anymore, maced enough claiming it to be "tangier" than tear-gas, and both Chris and Dan being jailed on occasion. In nearly all of his revenge missions, Dan calls his best friend and summer camp friend, Chris, over for help. Dan's everyday outfit consists of blue jeans, black dress shoes, and a black T-shirt that says "JERK" in capital white letters. He has black hair, green eyes, a soul patch, and round teeth. He is short, scruffy, rowdy, and messy. Dan is lactose intolerant, buys on sale, past-the-expiration-date turkey, and has a distaste for vegetables making his sub sandwiches all meat. He has a strong attachment to his car, despite its state of needed repair; several of his "revenge missions" are instigated by people damaging or tampering with it, and his cat Mr. Mumbles. Initially assuming she is a male cat, Dan just settled on naming her Mr. Mumbles. Being very fond of his cat, he cannot remain angry at her for very long even by her habit of her "first instinct on always scratching [his] face-off" when she becomes very surprised and when forced to take a bath. He lives in an apartment hovel in North Hollywood, CA. According to his driver's license, Dan was born on Halloween of 1975. He serves as the main protagonist of the series.
 Chris (voiced by Dave Foley) – Dan's best friend and Elise's husband. Despite how much Dan mistreats him, he is almost always on call whenever Dan needs help with one of his revenge schemes. He is a complete pushover, big softy, and almost never can say no to his wife or best friend. He has a nearly uncontrollable appetite and has food on his mind most of the time. His regular outfit consists of a blue T-shirt, an orange over-shirt, and cargo pants with many pockets, and white socks with brown flip-flops. He has light brown hair and blue eyes. He is also a sleep-walker, as it is mentioned by both Elise and Dan that he sometimes sleep-walks to the kitchen and eats. He has a pathological fear of prairies causing him to become crazed and run around uncontrollably due to his root fear of becoming alone and isolated. Chris works at a temp agency and holds different office jobs that vary from episode to episode, being shown as Chris hating them, but bearing with them even when they are "soul-sucking" and causes him "to become numb" (mentioned in "Dan vs The Boss"). He lives with Elise in a single-story suburban house in Van Nuys, California. Often, when Dan is in trouble with the law, Chris and Elise bail him out and advise him from getting too rowdy and vengeful.
 Elise (voiced by Paget Brewster) – Chris's level-headed kind-hearted wife. She is usually calm and easy-going but can become dangerous when provoked and annoyed over-the-line. She is constantly annoyed by Dan's revenge antics, though she rarely tries to stop her husband whenever he goes off to help Dan. She will occasionally help Dan herself if she believes it to be necessary, advantageous, or childhood trauma. Elise works as a covert field agent for an unnamed (but presumably American) 'quasi' government agency and her work for said agency often acts as a subplot in several episodes. Elise normally wears a white T-shirt with red trim, blue hip-huggers, and red sneakers. Her hair is reddish-brown (mostly purple) and her eyes are purple and heavily dilated. She has a younger teen brother named Ben. Elise's mother also has the first name "Elise", causing the elder Elise to refer to the younger Elise as "Elise Jr." or simply "Junior", causing her to become childish and frustrated.
 Mr. Mumbles (vocals by Paget Brewster) – Dan's cat that he rescued from an animal shelter while taking revenge on the unbearably noisy Animal Shelter right across the street being it directly behind his apartment. He later learned through a hired hobo, on one of Dan's missions, that Mr. Mumbles is female, though he still calls her "Mr". Dan appears to be able to understand her meows and engage in meaningful conversation with her and she often manages to calm him down and make him forget his fits of rage with her cuteness. Dan seems to have trained her to perform several numbered escape plans planned out among his apartment in case of break-ins or various other disasters. Like her owner, she is messy and scruffy.

Supporting
 Crunchy (voiced by Tom Kenny) – A dreadlock-wearing hippie who has the misfortune of working as a store clerk in several places that Dan takes revenge on. He has a ridiculously laid-back personality, to the point that on one instance he was completely unfazed by being caught in an explosion (at least until he discovers that his dreadlocks were burned off). His insistence on being too lazy and in-with-the-flow of things have often made him an accidental target among Dan's missions when angered by whatever establishment that Crunchy is currently randomly working in at the time. Despite their several encounters, neither Dan nor Crunchy seem to recognize each other as a huge enemy whenever they meet.
Sheriff (voiced by John DiMaggio) - He's a big, chubby, tough police man who is seen every time Dan make reports and false reports. Every time Dan makes trouble, the sheriff use a taser to shock him. 
 Don (voiced by Michael Gross) – Elise's father who runs a successful cupcake store chain and hates Chris to the point of trying to cause Elise to marry another man by various means (usually at Chris's expense). At certain instances, when given the chance, he would love to see Chris badly hurt or injured.
 Elise Sr. (voiced by Meredith Baxter) – Elise's mother, who dislikes Chris but not quite as much as her husband as she keeps her time and attention to an unspecified Mafia family, a fact none of the other characters are aware of (much like Elise's hidden job with the government) At one time, both Elise and Elise Sr. had to fight each other, as their missions were in conflict with each other.
 Ninja Dave (voiced by Eric Bauza) – A former ninja of the Koshugi clan who swore never to bake cookies, thus had to steal them whenever he wanted to eat some and to destroy any rivals of his clan. Having been ill during a field trip that ended in a fatal bus crash, he was the last surviving member of the Koshugi clan. After a sword duel with Elise, and Dan helping, he reformed and opened a cookie shop to which acts as the main hangout for Dan, Elise, Chris, and several of the series' main and recurring characters (Dan goes there for the lactose-free treats).
 Spy Boss (voiced by Dan Mandel) – The unnamed and unseen boss of Elise who sends her on different missions during specific episodes. It is revealed he is a former super model in the episode "The Common Cold" as he was in a drive-through trying to get some take-out by his microphone. He and Elise were good friends, then once Elise became a super agent and he becomes one of the new bosses, he had to erase her memory of his appearance just to keep his identity 'a secret'.
 Hortense (voiced by Grey DeLisle) – An air-head employee of the Burgerphile restaurant who falls for Dan after he begins a protest against the restaurant because they gave him the wrong order (cheese when it was asked for no cheese {this happened again in another episode}). After the establishment's head-manager refused to correct himself, Dan chains himself to the counter in protest. The two briefly "date" during Dan's protest, during this time the head-manager asked Hortense to use Dan's love to stop the protest. Instead, Hortense decides to call a news agency to bring attention toward the conflict between Dan and the manager. The two break up by the end of the episode when she gets promoted to regional manager in another district and Dan refuses to make her "give up on her dream". She later returns and announces she is to be married to the owner of Burgerphile named Jeremiah Burger which drives Dan insane, as he feels deceived. At the wedding, Dan tries to have a plane write out Dan's love in the sky. Yet the plane ends up accidentally breaking and unintentionally crashing into the wedding. Dan then goes to trying to keep Hortense from marrying Burger as he has married, divorced, and killed his wives (he had seven wives). It turns out that Dan had misinterpreted that statement, as all the wives were at the wedding. Dan attempts to gain back Hortense's love, but fails and reluctantly leaves her. She is the only person whom Dan consistently treats with kindness during the show's entire duration.
 The Imposter (voiced by John C. McGinley) – An unnamed man who one day shows up in Dan's apartment claiming to be Dan. He manipulates everyone around him and portrays himself as a "good neighbor" to steal Dan's life. He is later arrested for a crime Dan committed, and swears revenge. He later returns as a telemarketer who continually harasses Dan with phone calls, determined to "drive him absolutely batty, nut-so, around the bend". He eventually gets Dan arrested, taking his vacation while Dan spends his time in prison for his own mistakes.
 Ben (voiced by Eric Bauza) – Elise's younger brother who was mentioned in the episodes "Elise's Parents" and "The Family Camping Trip"and makes an appearance in "The Family Thanksgiving" and "The Dinosaur". Ben is allergic to cats and has a video game addiction. He dislikes Chris and tends to insult him by his weight. He's also trying to get his driver's license with the help from Chris, even though it's noted he has a distaste for him. After the episode "The Dinosaur", the episode that Ben helps Chris and Dan track down a Dinosaur for Dan's car repair damages, he has grown fond of him (but still pokes at him at times).
 Mechanic Mike (voiced by Kurtwood Smith) – Dan's local mechanic who works on his car free of charge since he loves working on off-brand Filipino cars. Years ago, he was in a part of a society where people build robotic armors out of car parts and battle in areas. Originally just for fun, as years progressed, he became so addicted that gambling started and he was losing money so much that he overcharged customers, stole their parts and tried to sell his garage. This was why he stole Dan's car parts, replaced them with household items and lied to him about fictitious parts so he can build a robotic suit out of them. Dan not knowing about Mike's past life before hand, influenced Dan to threaten to beat Mike up. At the end, Dan won the battle against Elise in a robot match allowing him to quit the sport forever and fix Dan's car again, and whenever he needs, to for free.
 Vegan Vic – Owner of the Vegan Vic store chain in [Dan Vs. Vegetables]. He has a violently strict way of regulating his code of vegetable-only diet; at one time almost chopping off a vegetarian's head with a plow, but stopped once Dan and Chris entered the store. In the end, Vegan Vic eats a broccoli monster Dan accidentally created by a genome-re-organizer (a machine made by Elise for her job). He has hatred for any vegetarian that almost eats meat.

Voice actors

Main cast
Curtis Armstrong was chosen to voice the part of Dan from early production, as were Dave Foley and Paget Brewster who voice Chris and Elise, respectively.

Additional voices
The series employs many guest stars and recurring roles. Carlos Alazraqui portrays a balloon cult member in the episode "New Mexico", both a surfer and a lifeguard in "The Beach", Maurice in "The Fancy Restaurant", Magnifico the Magnificent in "The Magician", and Flynn Goodhill in "Parents", among others. Matt Angel guest starred as a Burgerphile employee in "The Wedding". René Auberjonois is the voice of Chef Puree in "The Fancy Restaurant". Michael Gross and Meredith Baxter (of Family Ties fame) both play the voice of Elise's parents Don and Elise Sr. (respectively). Felicia Day voices the boss in his titular role "The Boss". John DiMaggio plays the voice of a police officer in three episodes, and a security guard in "baseball". Jenna Fischer voices Amber in "Anger Management". Judy Greer does the part of Jennifer in "The Neighbors". Seth Green does the voice of the mummy in his titular episode "The Mummy". Ernie Hudson played the voice of the Camp Counselor in "Summer Camp".

Other guest stars include Clancy Brown, Mark Hamill, Tom Kenny, Bill Kopp, Kevin McDonald, John C. McGinley, Daran Norris, Kurtwood Smith, Cree Summer, Harland Williams, and Henry Winkler for various parts.

Production
Mandel's original idea was for the show to be a live-action sitcom, but new possibilities opened up once they started development for an animated series. The show was pitched to various networks, including Adult Swim.

Series creators Dan Mandel and Chris Pearson conceived the personalities of the main characters Dan and Chris by loosely basing them on their own negative qualities. He has stated that the show's self-mockery with the character Dan was in part inspired by the works of Evan Dorkin. Pearson once stated that he thought of the Dan character as "Calvin [from Calvin and Hobbes] as a grownup, if his life had gone horribly wrong somewhere."

The series is animated in Adobe Flash. The design for the characters was handled by a team of artists led by supervising director Matt Danner with some involvement from Mandel and Pearson. The vocal cast was selected through an audition first consisting of pre-recorded voice-overs, followed by several rounds of callbacks. Curtis Armstrong stood out prominently to the creators as the voice of Dan from the beginning of the process. The idea to have Meredith Baxter and Michael Gross portray Elise's parents Elise Sr. and Don came from executive producer Jay Fukuto, who had worked with them during their time together on Family Ties. Co-creator Dan Mandel does many voices in the series.

Cancellation 
On October 17, 2013, Armstrong announced on his Facebook page that the show has been canceled. His statement read:

Broadcast 
The series premiered on January 1, 2011 on The Hub, and ended its first season on July 9, 2011. The second season of Dan Vs. began on November 19, 2011, and continued through June 23, 2012. Dan Vs. was renewed for a third season, which premiered November 17, 2012 and ended on March 9, 2013.

Awards and nominations

References

External links

 

2010s American animated television series
2010s American children's comedy television series
2011 American television series debuts
2013 American television series endings
American children's animated comedy television series
American flash animated television series
English-language television shows
Discovery Family original programming
Television series by Film Roman
Animated television series about dysfunctional families
Television series about revenge
Television shows set in Los Angeles